The discography of American rapper Chief Keef consists of four studio albums, four extended plays, thirty-eight mixtapes, and twenty-eight singles (including seventeen as a featured artist). Chief Keef released his first studio album Finally Rich in 2012, which contained several successful singles, including "I Don't Like", "Hate Bein' Sober", and "Love Sosa". The album peaked at number 29 on the Billboard 200 and number 2 on the Billboard Rap chart. In 2013 he was featured on several hit songs by other rappers. In 2014 he released his mixtape Back from the Dead 2, which was critically acclaimed. In 2015 he was featured on Travis Scott's debut album Rodeo on the song "Nightcrawler". He later released the album Bang 3 in two parts. Following this Chief Keef decided go on a one-year hiatus. In 2017, he released three mixtapes and then released the album Dedication. He then released more mixtapes in 2018. In 2019, he released his collaborative album with Zaytoven called GloToven which has a sole feature from Lil Pump. He then went on a hiatus for around 2 years, to return with his fourth album 4NEM.

Albums

Studio albums

Mixtapes

EPs

Singles

As lead artist

As featured artist

Other charted songs

Guest appearances

Production discography

Notes

References

Discographies of American artists
Hip hop discographies